Thémines is a commune in the Lot department in south-western France. It is located to the south-west of Rueyres, on the road between Figeac and Gramat.

See also
Communes of the Lot department

References

Communes of Lot (department)